Sterna is a genus of seabirds.

Sterna may also refer to:

Sterna, the plural of sternum, the breastbone
Sterna, Argolis, Greece
Sterna, Drama, Greece
Sterna, Evros, Greece
Sterna Island, a small island off Graham Land, Antarctic Peninsula